This article is about music-related events in 1821.

Events 
Construction work begins on the Teatro Regio at Parma.
José Bernardo Alcedo wins a contest, sponsored by General José de San Martín, to choose a national anthem for Peru. The anthem is "Somos libres, seámoslo siempre," with lyrics by José de la Torre Ugarte.

Classical music 
Ludwig van Beethoven – Piano Sonata No. 31
Friedrich Wilhelm Kalkbrenner – Piano Sextet Op. 58
Friedrich Kuhlau – 9 Variations For Piano
Felix Mendelssohn – Symphonies for Strings 1–6
George Onslow – Cello Sonata, Op.16 No.3 (with viola part)

Ferdinand Ries 
2 Piano Sonatinas, Op. 5
Fantasie nach Schiller's Gedicht 'Resignation', Op. 109
Franz Schubert
 "Gesang der Geister über den Wassern", D.714; part song for male voices and low strings; Op.posth. 167 (1858)
 Symphony No. 7 in E major, D 729
Louis Spohr
Clarinet Concerto No. 3 in F minor, WoO 19
Mass in C minor, Op. 54
Jan Václav Voříšek – Symphony in D
Carl Maria von Weber – Konzertstück in F minor, for piano and orchestra, Op. 79

Opera 
Johann Kaspar Aiblinger – Rodrigo und Chimene
Michele Carafa – Jeanne d'Arc à Orléans
Saverio Mercadante 
Andronico
Elisa e Claudio
Giovanni Pacini – Cesare in Egitto
Gioachino Rossini – Matilde di Shabran, premiered Feb. 24 in Rome.
Carl Maria von Weber – Der Freischütz

Publications 
Ananias Davisson – Introduction to Sacred Music, Extracted from the Kentucky Harmony and Chiefly Intended for the Benefit of Young Scholars

Births 
April 27 – Henry Willis, organ builder (d. 1901) 
May 6 – Emilie Hammarskjöld, composer (d. 1854)
May 25 – Diederich Krug, pianist and composer (d. 1880)
June 15 – Nikolai Zaremba, musical theorist and composer (d. 1879)
June 27 – August Conradi, organist and composer (d. 1873)
July 18 – Pauline Viardot, singer and composer (d. 1910)
October 4 – Fanny Stål pianist (d. 1889)
October 8 – Friedrich Kiel, composer (d. 1885)
October 13 – Oscar Byström, academic and composer (d. 1909)
October 16 – Franz Doppler, flautist and composer (d. 1883)
October 20 – Emilio Arrieta, composer (d. 1894)
December 8 – Josif Runjanin, composer of the Croatian national anthem (d. 1878)
December 22 – Giovanni Bottesini, composer (d. 1889)

Deaths 
March 8 – Harriett Abrams, operatic soprano (b. c.1758)
May 15 – John Wall Callcott, composer (b. 1766)
June 25 – Antoine Bullant, bassoonist and composer (born 1750)
August 6 – Antonio Bartolomeo Bruni, violinist, conductor and composer (born 1757)
August 10 – Salvatore Viganò, choreographer and composer (born 1769)
September 22 – Louise-Rosalie Lefebvre, "Madame Dugazon", entertainer (born 1755)
October 28 – Gaspare Pacchierotti, castrato singer (born 1740)
November 10 – Andreas Romberg, violinist and composer (born 1767)
date unknown 
Jules Granier, composer (born 1770) 
Kamalakanta Bhattacharya, Bengali poet and songwriter (born 1722)

References

 
19th century in music
Music by year